This is a list of awards and nominations received by South Korean singer-songwriter and actress Lee Ji-eun, best known by her stage name IU.

IU won Song of the Year at both the 3rd Melon Music Awards and the 9th Korean Music Awards for her single "Good Day". That same year, she won Record of the Year (Digital) at the 20th Seoul Music Awards and Best Solo Vocal Performance at the 13th Mnet Asian Music Awards. The single gathered a total of seven trophies on three music programs including Music Bank, Inkigayo and M Countdown. Her second Korean album Last Fantasy yielded one single, "You and I". Upon its release, Last Fantasy was a commercial success, selling almost seven million copies of digital tracks in its first week of release. The total number of its digital sales surpassed the 10 million mark the following week. The album sold over 117,000 copies, making it the 15th best-selling Korean album in 2011. The following year, she won Record of the Year (Album) and Best Female Artist at the 14th Mnet Asian Music Awards. She additionally earned ten trophies on music programs for her lead single "You & I".

In 2017, IU was one of the most nominated and awarded acts at the 9th Melon Music Awards, winning three out of six nominations, including Album of the Year, Top 10 Artists, and the Best Songwriter Award. At the 7th Gaon Chart Music Awards, she was nominated in seven categories winning five, including Lyricist of the Year and Producer of the Year for her third Korean album Palette. The singer also won Best Pop Album for Palette respectively at the 15th Korean Music Awards. At the 2018 Golden Disc Awards, she won two categories including Song of the Year for "Through the Night".

She has been honored the Prime Minister's Commendation in 2015 by the  Ministry of Culture, Sports and Tourism for her work as a musician and was recognized as a style icon by the Style Icon Awards in 2008 and 2011, respectively. In 2012, IU was identified as one of the most influential people in South Korea by the Forbes Korea Power Celebrity list, and has since been mentioned five times. IU has also won several awards for her work as an actress, earning the title of "Best New Actress" at the 2014 KBS Drama Awards for her performance in You're the Best.


Awards and nominations

Other accolades

Honors

Listicles

Notes

References 

IU
Lee Ji-eun
Awards